The Lulworth Estate is a country estate located in central south Dorset, England. Its most notable landscape feature is a five-mile stretch of coastline on the Jurassic Coast, a World Heritage Site, including Durdle Door and Lulworth Cove.

The historic estate includes the Lulworth Castle and park. The landscaped gardens are Grade II listed in the National Register of Historic Parks and Gardens. The castle was residence to the Weld family until 1929 when it was ravaged by fire.

The 12,000 acre estate is predominantly owned by the Weld family, who have lived there for several generations. The Lulworth Estate was once part of a grander estate under Thomas Howard, 3rd Viscount Howard of Bindon.

References

External links
 The Lulworth Estate website

Isle of Purbeck
Jurassic Coast
Grade II listed parks and gardens in Dorset